Mezzettia is a genus of plant in family Annonaceae. It contains the following species, according to The Plant List (which list may be incomplete):
 Mezzettia havilandii (Boerl.) Ridl.
 Mezzettia macrocarpa Heyden & Kessler
 Mezzettia parviflora Becc.
 Mezzettia umbellata Becc.

References

Annonaceae
Annonaceae genera
Taxa named by Odoardo Beccari
Taxonomy articles created by Polbot